Newspaper Rock State Historic Monument is a Utah state monument featuring a rock panel carved with one of the largest known collections of petroglyphs.

The  rock is a part of the vertical Wingate sandstone cliffs that enclose the upper end of Indian Creek Canyon, and is covered by hundreds of petroglyphs—one of the largest, best preserved and easily accessed groups in the Southwest. The petroglyphs feature a mixture of human, animal, material and abstract forms.

Newspaper Rock was designated a State Historical Monument in 1961, and was added to the National Register of Historic Places listings in San Juan County, Utah as Indian Creek State Park in 1976.

Petroglyphs
The first carvings at the Newspaper Rock site were made around 2,000 years ago, left by people from the Archaic, Anasazi, Fremont, Navajo, Anglo, and Pueblo cultures.

In Navajo, the rock is called "Tse' Hone'" which translates to a rock that tells a story.

The petroglyphs were carved by Native Americans during both the prehistoric and historic periods. There are over 650 rock art designs. The drawings on the rock are of different animals, human figures, and symbols. These carvings include pictures of deer, buffalo, and pronghorn antelope. Some glyphs depict riders on horses, while other images depict past events like in a newspaper. While precisely dating the rock carvings has been difficult, repatination of surface minerals reveals their relative ages. The reason for the large concentration of the petroglyphs is unclear. One suggested explanation is that the rock was used as a place for communication through the petroglyphs between travelers.

The pictures at Newspaper Rock were inscribed into the dark coating on the rock, called desert varnish. Desert varnish is mainly made up (~70%) by clay materials, but gets its blackish color from iron and manganese oxide deposits that gradually form on exposed sandstone cliff faces owing to the action of rainfall and bacteria. The ancient artists produced the many types of figures and patterns by carefully chipping the coated rock surfaces with sharpened tools to remove the desert varnish and expose the lighter rock beneath. The older figures are themselves becoming darker in color as new varnish slowly develops.

Depiction of Polydactyly 

Many of the petroglyphs appear to be depicting polydactyly, the condition of having an extra toe or finger. In other Puebloan sites, burial remains with bifid metatarsals have been found near petroglyphs depicting polydactyly, suggesting that the pictures factually represent a real physical abnormality. One team of anthropologists excavated 96 skeletons from the nearby site of Pueblo Bonito and found that 3.1% of the skeletons had an extra toe on the right foot. This is a significantly higher rate of polydactyly than is seen in current Native American populations. There was evidence towards those with six toes being buried with items associated with higher social status, like an ornate bracelet, and turquoise. Polydactyl is also considered a moderately heritable condition, with 30-35% of those displaying the defect also having a close relative with polydactyl. This means that it may be possible to use polydactyl to reconstruct ancient Puebloan lineages.

See also
 Painted Rock Petroglyph Site
 Tutuveni

References

External links

 US Department of the Interior Bureau of Land Management page on Newspaper Rock
 Newspaper Rock Petroglyph Panel 8.5 x 11, 600 dpi, black-on-white rendition of entire panel.

Archaeological cultures of North America
Native American history of Utah
Petroglyphs in Utah
Protected areas of San Juan County, Utah
Puebloan buildings and structures
State parks of Utah
1961 establishments in Utah
Protected areas established in 1961
Bears Ears National Monument